Francis Anderson may refer to:

Sir Francis Anderson (philosopher) (1858–1941), Australian philosopher and educationist
Francis T. Anderson (1808–1887), Virginia judge
Sir Francis Anderson (MP for Newcastle-upon-Tyne) (1614–1679), English Royalist and politician
Francis Sheed Anderson (1897–1966), Scottish businessman, civil servant and politician
Francis Evelyn Anderson (1752–1821), British Army officer and politician, MP for Great Grimsby, and for Beverley

See also
Frank Anderson (disambiguation)
Frances Anderson (disambiguation)

Francis Andersen (born 1925), Australian scholar